Kobuleti Strict Nature Reserve is a protected area in Kobuleti Municipality, Adjara region of Georgia along the Black Sea coast in the northern part of the resort town Kobuleti.  
Kobuleti Protected Areas  were  established in 1998 to preserve  unique wetland ecosystems recognized by the Ramsar Convention. Because of these wetland ecosystems, ancient forests, and the high biodiversity found within the reserve, it was inscribed on the UNESCO World Heritage List as part of the Colchic Rainforests and Wetlands in 2021. 

Kobuleti Protected Areas include the Kobuleti Strict Nature Reserve  and Kobuleti Managed Reserve, located on the left and right banks of Shavi Ghele (black creek) river respectively.
Kobuleti Strict Nature Reserve  occupies territory bordered by the Togoni river on the north, the Kobuleti—Ozurgeti highway on the east, Shavi Ghele river on the south and Kobuleti suburbs on the west.

Geography 
Reserve has flat surface with minor erosion by the rivers of Shavi Ghele  and Togoni and by a few water drains. It is peat bog which consists mainly of peat moss with hardly noticeable surface elevations which are called locally peat domes. These minor elevations rise 1–3 m above it surroundings.  Bog in this area is composed of a single peat layer with thickness from 5 m up to 9 m.

Climate 
The reserve has a humid marine subtropical climate with high relative humidity and periodic strong winds. Because of the influence of the surrounding mountains, the reserve is exceptionally humid, with annual rainfall often exceeding 1500–2500 mm. The primary wet season is during the autumn and winter.

Flora 
The Kobuleti Strict NatureReserve is very rich in plant species. Many of plants are of boreal origin and appeared here during the Ice Age of the Quaternary period. Most of the area is covered with various peat mosses, in particular variety of sphagnum species, such as white sphagnum moss and Imeretian sedge (Molinia litoralis), white beak sedge (Rhynchospora alba), Caucasian beak sedge (Rhynchospora caucasica), Great Pond-sedge (Carex riparia), buckbean (Menyanthes trifoliata) and carnivorous round-leaved sundew (Drosera rotundifolia) to name some. Local Colchic plants also grow in peat mires including  Pontic rhododendron (Rhododendron ponticum), Yellow azalea (Rhododendron luteum), climber (Smilax excelsa) and rare, threatened Royal fern (Osmunda regalis).

Fauna 
Kobuleti Protected Areas provide habitat for migrating, nesting and wintering water birds including Gallinago media, which is on the IUCN Red List of Threatened Species, Gallinago gallinago and many others.

Mammals are represented by  jackal, Eurasian otter (Lutra lutra), badger, nutria, hare, woodmouse, fieldmouse, et al. Eurasian otter is included in the Red List of Georgia.

Amphibians are represented by Caspian turtle (Mauremys caspica) and marsh turtle, common toad, green toad, common tree frog, et al.

Reptiles are represented by dice snake, grass snake, slow worm, European legless lizard (Pseudopus apodus), striped lizard (Lacerta strigata), common newt, et al.

Ichthyofauna include such species as Northern pike, Crucian carp, European perch and silver eel.

See also 
 Kobuleti Managed Reserve
 Kolkheti National Park

References 

National parks of Georgia (country)
Protected areas established in 1998
Geography of Adjara
Tourist attractions in Adjara